Restaurante Arroyo is the world's largest single Mexican restaurant, located in the Tlalpan area of Mexico City. The restaurant, which employs more than 1,000 people during its peak season, has seating for 2,200 patrons in nine dining rooms, and parking for 600 cars. It also features stages for musical performances, an array of wandering mariachi and jarocho bands, an infirmary, an area for hosting piñata parties, a cockfighting pit, a mechanical bull, and its own bullring.

History and noted menu items
Restaurante Arroyo was founded by Jose Arroyo and Maria Aguirre de Arroyo in 1940; their son and grandson still run it. Although its menu has expanded along with its size, its principal claim to gastronomic fame was and is its dishes featuring lamb and mutton, such as barbacoa de borrego (slow-roasted barbecue mutton) and consome de borrego, soup made from the drippings of the roasting lamb and sheep.

The restaurant has been featured on Rick Bayless' PBS cooking show, Mexico: One Plate at a Time. In My Last Supper: 50 Great Chefs and Their Final Meals: Portraits, Interviews, and Recipes, Bayless identified it as the restaurant in which he would choose to have his last meal.

In terms of size and number of diversions for diners, it is similar to the more famous Denver restaurant Casa Bonita.

On January 30, 2010, it hosted two world championship boxing fights: In one, former world champion Jorge Arce defeated noted contender Angky Angkota of Indonesia in a seven-round technical decision for the vacant World Boxing Organization's world bantamweight title; in the other, Jackie Nava defended the interim World Boxing Council's female world Super Bantamweight title with a ten-round unanimous decision victory over Chantal Martínez inside the restaurant area.

References

External links
Restaurante Arroyo Official Site

Restaurants established in 1940
Mexican restaurants
Restaurants in Mexico City
Tourist attractions in Mexico City
1940 establishments in Mexico
Tlalpan